Coal mining has historically been an important industry in Ukraine. Coal mining in Ukraine is often associated with coal-rich Donets basin. However this is not the only coal mining region, other being Lviv-Volhynian basin and Dnieper brown coal mining basin. The Donets basin located in the eastern Ukraine is the most developed and much bigger coal mining region in the country.

Ukraine was until recently, the third largest coal producer in Europe. In 1976, national production was 218 million metric tonnes. By 2016, production had dropped to 41 million metric tonnes. The Donets Black Coal Basin in the eastern Ukraine, with 90% of the nation's reserves, suffers from three connected problems: (1) mines are not profitable enough to sustain capital investment, resulting in twenty-year old mining equipment and processes, (2) the government, taking advice from the International Monetary Fund, has discontinued $600 million annual mining subsidies, and (3) the Ukrainian government refuses to buy from mines controlled by the self-proclaimed Donetsk People's Republic and Luhansk People's Republic.

History

Coal mining began in Ukraine in 1870. In 1913, Donetz produced 87% of the coal in the Russian Empire. It produced 50% of the metallurgical coal of the USSR. Like other Soviet enterprises, coal companies provided social facilities including schools and hospitals

Coal reserves
Ukraine's coal reserves are estimated at 60 billion tonnes, of which 23 billion are proven and probable, and 10 billion tonnes are economically extractable. According to the Ukrainian mining trade union, coal constitutes 95% of Ukraine's domestic energy resources.

Ninety percent of Ukraine's coal reserves are located in the Donets Coalfield (easternmost part of the country). Control of this portion of the country is disputed. Russian-backed rebels claim sovereignty over the region. Mid-March 2017 Ukrainian President Petro Poroshenko signed a decree on a temporary ban on the movement of goods to and from territory controlled by the self-proclaimed Donetsk People's Republic and Luhansk People's Republic meaning that since then Ukraine does not buy coal from the Donets Black Coal Basin.

Two other coalfields include one in the northwest, the Lviv-Volhynian Coalfield, between Lviv and Volodymyr-Volynskyi. Another, the Dnieper Coalfield in central Ukraine, offers lignite (brown coal), but the mining of lignite stalled in the 1990s.

Coal mining

n.b.: 2014, 2015, and 2016 do not include extraction in the territory occupied by the separatists.

Coal mining is one of the largest employers in Ukraine. The country's coal industry employs about 500,000 people.

In July 2014, several mines were closed in Eastern Ukraine because of fighting during the 2014 pro-Russian conflict in Ukraine. Because of this War in Donbass (according to the Ukrainian Energy and Coal Industry Ministry) raw coal production in Ukraine dropped by 22.4% from 2013, to 64.976 million tonnes. As a result, Ukraine begun importing power-generating coal from South Africa and Russia. Lack of coal for Ukraine's coal-fired power stations and a shut down of one of the six reactors of the Zaporizhzhia Nuclear Power Plant lead to rolling blackouts throughout the country from early till late December 2014.

Consumption, import and export

Coal consumption in 2012 grew to 61.207 million tonnes, up 6.2% compared with 2011. Most is used for public utilities and for power generation. However local coal only provides 50% of the country’s electricity needs, therefore requiring Ukraine to import from Russia and Poland.

As of 2013, the Ukrainian government plans to completely replace the natural gas used in the steel industry and some other economic sectors with coal.

Coal powered 38% of Ukrainian electrical generation in 2014. The relative cost of domestic coal versus imported coal, nuclear and gas, made it unworkable. In 2016, the nation imported 15.648 million tonnes of coal and anthracite worth of $1.467 billion. In the year before the start of the Russo-Ukrainian War, 2013, Ukraine exported 500 thousand tonnes and imported 25 million tonnes. In 2016, Ukraine exported 520,585 tonnes of coal and anthracite worth of $44.762 million.

In 2019, Ukraine produced the highest amount of PM10 particulates and sulfur dioxide air pollution emissions in Europe from coal fired electricity generation. None of Ukraine's power plants have desulfurization equipment other than a small trial plant on unit 2 of Trypilska thermal power plant.

In June 2020, the Government of Ukraine prioritized the usage of coal at Ukrainian power stations to reduce the import of natural gas used at the power stations for electricity production.

Mine safety

Mine safety is the result of geology and human factors. The geology of Ukrainian coal mines is not favorable: seam thickness is small, seams are deep, and methane is common. The coal mines of Donbas are one of the most hazardous in the world due to enormous working depths (down from 300 to 1200 m) as a result of natural depletion, as well as due to high levels of methane explosion, coal dust explosion and rock burst dangers. As the Economic Review points out, "Since 1991, up to 300 [miners] have died at work every year".

Low profitability of Ukrainian mines has not attracted capital investment. As a result, the machinery and the processes used to dig coal are twenty years old. These methods are less safe on a per-miner basis and require more miners.

The Zasyadko Mine stands as an example of Donbass mine safety. It was opened in 1958 and privatized in 1992, since which time it has had seven major accidents, including the 2007 Zasyadko mine disaster (101 workers killed) and the 2015 Zasyadko mine disaster (17 killed).

Corruption and illegal mining
Ukrainian mines are sometimes run by mafia-like organizations. Often, these organizations derive large incomes from the mines that belong to the government. As a result, underfinancing causes many employees to have to wait to receive their monthly salary for weeks or even months. Additionally, a lack of financing influences the condition of many coal mines. Old mines don’t receive the necessary financial aid, therefore they are not being renovated or remodeled annually. All these problems together with other challenges have resulted in "gradually declining production capacity and a loss of global market share".

In the Donets Basin there are many extremely dangerous illegal mines.

Gallery

See also

 Energy in Ukraine
Rotterdam plus

References

External links

 
Geology of Ukraine